Lia Scott Price is a horror fiction author and independent filmmaker. She is known for the characters Serial Killer and Vampire Guardian Angels which she created for her books and films. In addition to writing and producing, she is also the creator of the Serial Killer and Vampire Guardian Angels comic book series.

Filmography

 2012, Pra/ey: A Vampire Short
 2011, Scenes From A Novel: The Guardian, Revenant, and Dominion Short Films
 2010, The Serial Killer and Vampire Guardian Angel Diaries 
 2009, Horror Writing With Lia Scott Price
 2009, Lia Scott Price’s Letters to Mother
 2009, Lia Scott Price’s Demonic & Negative Entity Possession
 2008, Lia Scott Price’s Dark Fiction 
 2008, Lia Scott Price’s Nightmares
 2007, Normal, California
 2006, The Guardian
 2006, Dominion

Bibliography

 2009, The Guardian, Revenant, and Dominion (Horror Trilogy), CreateSpace, 
 2009, Letters To Mother, CreateSpace, 
 2003, Revenant, iUniverse, 
 2003, Resurrection, iUniverse, 
 2002, Body and Blood, iUniverse, 
 2002, Ghostwriter, iUniverse, 
 2002, The Guardian, iUniverse, Optioned as a screenplay by The Triton Film Group in 2002.
 2000, The Frog Asylum, iUniverse,

Comic series

 2012, Vampire Guardian Angels, Volume 1 – 3

References

External links
 Lia Scott Price Official Website
 

Female comics writers
Living people
Year of birth missing (living people)